SNCF 040.DF was a class of one prototype diesel-hydraulic locomotive built for the SNCF built in 1952 by Renault.

In 1962 it was renumbered from 040.DF.1 to BB 60041.

Like the 060.DA, it was delivered in a livery of dark green with a yellow stripe.

Models 
The SNCF 040.DF has been produced in HO scale by  ApocopA as a cast resin bodyshell for mounting on an underframe of the modelmakers' choice.

See also 
 List of SNCF classes

Diesel locomotives of France
SNCF locomotives
Railway locomotives introduced in 1952
B′B′ locomotives
Standard gauge locomotives of France

Freight locomotives
Experimental locomotives 
Individual locomotives of France